Pille Pürg (born 9 March 1972 in Tartu) is an Estonian actress, comedian and parodist.

Pürg graduated from Tartu Secondary School No. 5 in 1990. In 2012, she graduated from the Helsinki Theatre Academy with a degree in television and comedy acting.

From 1991 until 2003, Pürg worked at Vanalinnastuudio in Tallinn as an actress and performance director. She later worked at the Old Baskin's Theatre in Tallinn as a contracted actress. Pürg works predominantly in Estonia, as well as in Finland. She has performed on comedy tours with Madis Milling  and Henrik Normann since 2005.

Selected filmography

 1997–2000: Wigla show
 2003: Vanad ja kobedad saavad jalad alla (role: Nurse)
 2003–2004: Õpetajate tuba (role: History teacher Mari Säär)
 2005: Deus ex machina (role: Annabella)
 2018: Seltsimees laps (role: Officer's wife)
 2018: Elu Hammasratastel

References

1972 births
Living people
Estonian comedians
Estonian film actresses
Estonian stage actresses
Estonian television actresses
Actresses from Tartu